Simpl or SIMPL may refer to:

 Simpl (Munich), a venue in Munich, Germany
 simpl., an abbreviation for 'simplification' or 'simplified'
 SIMPL, a Linux project

See also 
 Simpel
 Simple (disambiguation)
 Sympl